Uranus is Shellac Record #2, a two song 7" on Touch and Go Records. It was released in 1993 on vinyl format only. It is believed that it was recorded at the same time as their first release, The Rude Gesture: A Pictorial History. As their first release had printed liner notes listing the microphones used during the recording, this release listed details about the recording tape, tape machines, and mastering equipment used.

Track listing

Side A
 "Doris" - 3:11

Side B
 "Wingwalker" - 5:00

Credits 
Steve Albini - guitar, vocals, recording engineer
Robert S. Weston IV - bass guitar, backing vocals, recording engineer
Todd Trainer - drums

References

Shellac (band) albums
1993 EPs
Albums produced by Steve Albini
Touch and Go Records EPs